The Tasman Football Association was an Australian rules football competition in Tasmania, Australia. The association had origins back to 1902 when games were played at random. In 1919 a proper association was set up. The association went into recess during World War II but returned.

The association folded 2001 with the Dodges Ferry Sharks moving to the Southern Football League while the Swansea Football Club and  Triabunna Football Club  moved to the Oatlands District Football Association (ODFA) a year prior. Campania folded but reformed in 2007 and joined the ODFA.

History
The Tasman Football Association was officially formed in 1910 but games had been played from approximately 1902 in the area. The teams in the first year of the competition were Wedge Bay, Nubeena, Carnarvon, Koonya and Fortescue Bay. The first premiership was won by Koonya who defeated Nubeena in the grand final. 

Carnarvon were the most successful club in the early years of the competition, taking out seven titles between 1922 and 1931. 
Koonya and Nubeena were also premiership winners during this period. Prior to WW2, the Tasman Rovers won three premierships between 1935 and 1937 before Port Arthur went back to back in 1938–39 before the war began. Taranna Football Club won their only known senior premiership in 1934 with a 13.17-95 to 5.7-37 win over Port Arthur.

The competition resumed after WW2 in 1946 with Port Arthur taking off where they left off winning the 1946 and 1947 premierships. Around this time Dunalley, joined the competition and almost straight away became a powerhouse of the competition. 
The 1960s were dominated by the Nubeena Tigers with the club winning 6 straight premierships and 12 premierships between 1957 and 1971. The 1972 season saw the introduction of the reserves competition, which Dunalley won the first 3 flags in, including winning the double seniors/reserves premierships in 1974. 
The 1978 season saw the Dodges Ferry Sharks Football Club enter the competition playing home games at the Copping Football Ground before Shark Park in Dodges Ferry was created. Dodges Ferry won both the seniors and reserves premierships in both 1979 and 1980. 

The South East District Football Association (SEDFA) folded at the end of the 1979 season which saw Mangalore, Triabunna, Lauderdale & Campania join the competition. Mangalore, who won the final SEDFA premiership in 1979 fell 5 points short of Dodges Ferry in the 1980 grand final. The club left after only 1 season to join the newly created Tasmanian Amateur Football League (Southern Division). Lauderdale then also left after the 1980 season.

Dunalley Football Club won back to back premierships in 1981–82, before new club Triabunna won 5 out of the next 6 premierships to be the dominant club throughout the 1980s. Triabunna also won 7 reserves premierships during this period.
 
The Tasman Football Club entered in 1983, however, only lasted 2 seasons before going into recess at the completion of the 1984 season. The 1984 season also saw foundation club Nubeena go into recess due to a lack of players. 
The Port Arthur Football Club also left at the end of the 1987 season to join the newly created Peninsula Football Association which Nubeena also entered. 
Dodges Ferry won the 1989, 1990 & 1991 premierships. An Under 16 competition was introduced in 1989, Campania winning this in its inaugural year. The 1992 season saw Richmond and Railway Football clubs join the competition, with Richmond going down to Triabunna by 3 points in the grand final and winning both the reserves and Under 16 premierships. Richmond then won the next 4 premierships between 1993 and 1996.

Railway Football Club went into recess at the completion of 1993 season due a shortage of players and former Fingal District Football Association club, Swansea joined the competition. Other clubs to go into recess during the 1990s was Dunalley in 1996 and Campania in 1998. Campania would come out of recess 10 years later in the ODFA where they still compete today. 

North Derwent won their only Tasman Football Association premiership in 1998 with a hard fought 3 goal win over Swansea. Swansea then won their first premiership in the competition, the following year in 1999. 

Prior to the 2000 season, Risdon Vale, went into recess due to a lack of players forcing the competition to compete with only 5 sides for the season. The season saw Richmond beat Triabunna in the decider by 30 points with Swansea winning their first reserves premiership in 25 years. 

At the completion of the 2000 season, Richmond successfully applied and joined the Old Scholars Football Association and Triabunna joined the Oatlands District Football Association (ODFA). 
This left only 3 teams for the following season in Dodges Ferry, Cambridge & Swansea. However, Risdon Vale reformed and entered both a seniors and reserves team. Railway also attempted to enter teams after going into recess after the 1993 season. 

However, Railway were unable to eventuate on this and Cambridge withdrew part way through the season leaving the competition to finish the season with only 3 clubs. Swansea won the grand final 28.13-181 over Dodges Ferry 9.13-67, with Dodges Ferry winning the reserves grand final over Swansea. This would be the final season of the Tasman Football Association which had been around for about 100 years. 

Around this time Dodges Ferry was a fast-growing area and applied and successfully joined the bigger, more powerful Southern Football League. The club has since become a strong club in this competition winning the 2006 senior premiership and coming runners up in 2010. 

Swansea then joined the ODFA were Triabunna, had the previous season. Swansea went on to win the 2004 and 2007 ODFA senior premierships before going into recess prior to the 2019 season due to a shortage of players. 

This left only Risdon Vale in the competition and with no option but to go into recess. Risdon Vale's players went to other clubs including Lindisfarne in the Southern Football League and OHA in the Old Scholars Football Association.
 
Teams to compete in the league at some stage were Port Arthur, Tunnel Bay, Taranna, TPT Rovers, Saltwater River, Wanderers (later named Timberworkers), Dunalley, Cambridge, Rokeby, Copping, Risdon Vale, Mangalore, Lauderdale, Sorell Seconds Team, Dodges Ferry, Swansea, North Derwent, Tasman Rovers, Railway, Tasman, Richmond and Campania, Lauderdale & Triabunna.

Clubs

Some of the clubs that participated in the association at some point include.
Port Arthur Football Club
Tunnel Bay Football Club
Tarana Football Club
T.P.T Rovers Football Club
Copping Football Club
Saltwater River Football Club
Fortescue Bay Football Club
Koonya Football Club
Canarvon Football Club
Wedge Bay Football Club
Cambridge Football Club: Magpies
Dodges Ferry Football Club: Sharks 1978–2001
Dunalley Football Club: Bulldogs
North Derwent Football Club: Forresters
Nubeena Football Club 1904–1984
Triabunna Football Club: Kangaroos 1980–2000
Campania Football Club
Railway Football Club 1992–1993
Swansea Football Club 1993–2001
Richmond Football Club
Tasman Football Club 1983–1984
Mangalore Football Club 1980
Risdon Vale Football Club

Premiers

See also
Australian rules football in Tasmania
Southern Football League (Tasmania)
Oatlands District Football Association
Dodges Ferry Sharks

References

Football News Tasmania 1990. (Sportsnews Tasmania)
Football News Tasmania 1991. (Sportsnews Tasmania)
http://www.fullpointsfooty.net/triabunna.htm
http://www.fullpointsfooty.net/dodges_ferry.htm
Stoward, John. Australian Rules Football in Tasmania. Digital Print Tasmania, 2002, ISBN 0-9577515-7-5

Defunct Australian rules football competitions in Tasmania